Oh Boy or Ooh Boy or variant, may refer to:

Film
Oh, Boy! (1919 film), an American film directed by Albert Capellani that was based upon the 1917 musical
Oh Boy! (1938 film), a British film of 1938
Oh Boy! (2012 film), a German film
Oh Boy! (1991 film), a Dutch film

Television
Oh Boy! (TV series), a British popular music television series (1958–1959)
"Oh, boy!", a catchphrase from Quantum Leap, an American television series (1989–1993)

Music
Oh Boy Records, an American record label
Oh, Boy! (musical), a 1917 musical

Albums
Oh Boy! (album), a 1977 album by Brotherhood of Man
Oh Boy (Don Cisco album), 2000
Oh Boy (The Paradise Motel album), 2013

Songs
"Oh, Boy!" (The Crickets song), 1957, later covered by Mud
"Oh Boy" (Cam'ron song), 2002
"Oh Boy (The Mood I'm In)", a 1975 song by Diana Trask, later covered by Brotherhood of Man
"Ooh Boy", a 1977 song by Rose Royce
"Oh Boy", a 2007 song by The Concretes
"Oh Boy", a 2007 song by Duffy
"Oh Boy", a 1997 song by UK garage duo The Fabulous Baker Boys
"Oh Boy", a song by G.E.M. from the album Xposed, 2012
"Ooh Boy", a song by En Vogue from the album Soul Flower, 2004

Other uses
Oh boy!, a 2000 French children's novel by Marie-Aude Murail

See also
 "Oh boy, oh boy, oh boy!", a 1946 song written by Lasse Dahlquist
Boy Oh Boy (disambiguation)
 Boy (disambiguation)